Norway played host to the Eurovision Song Contest 1986, so the country was automatically entered into the final in Bergen.

Before Eurovision

Melodi Grand Prix 1986 
The Norwegian national final to select their entry, the Melodi Grand Prix 1986, was held on 22 March 1986 at the Stavanger Forum convention center in Stavanger, hosted by actor Jarl Goli. The Band was conducted by Fred Nøddelund.

Ten songs competed with the winner being decided by four regional juries (Oslo, Lillehammer, Trondheim and Vadsø), a press jury composed of newspaper, radio and television journalists, the inhabitants of the Statfjord A oil rig in the North Sea and the studio audience in Stavanger.

The winning entry was "Romeo", composed and performed by Ketil Stokkan.

At Eurovision
Stokkan performed fourth on the night of the contest, following France and preceding the United Kingdom. At the close of the voting the song had received 44 points, placing 12th in a field of 20 competing countries.

Voting

References

External links
Norwegian National Final 1986
Full national final on nrk.no

1986
Countries in the Eurovision Song Contest 1986
1986
Eurovision
Eurovision